Igor Vyacheslavovich Khudogov (born 27 February 1978) is a Russian professional football official and a former player.

Club career
He played in the Russian Football National League for FC Petrotrest St. Petersburg in 2005.

References

External links
 

1978 births
Footballers from Saint Petersburg
Living people
Russian footballers
Association football defenders
FC Tyumen players
FC Petrotrest players
FC Tosno players
FC Dynamo Vologda players
FC Sever Murmansk players
FC Sheksna Cherepovets players
FC Zenit Saint Petersburg players
FC Zenit-2 Saint Petersburg players